Huawei Ascend is the first phone in the Huawei Ascend series.  It ran Android OS 2.1 by default. It has been released in the United States for Cricket Wireless and MetroPCS unsubsidized. As of the summer of 2012, the model is also available on the market in Europe.

The device features a 3.5-inch HVGA capacitive touch screen, 2.5 mm headphone jack, 3.2-megapixel camera, as well as an accelerometer and a compass. The HVGA capacitive touch screen is not multitouch capable.

First model is Huawei Ascend M860.

See also 
 MyTouch
 Huawei Ascend G300
 Huawei Ascend P1
 Huawei Ascend P2
 Huawei Ascend P6
 Huawei Ascend P7 (starting with the successor, Huawei P8, the "Ascend" label was dropped).

References

External links 
Cricket Huawei Ascend Page

 
Android (operating system) devices
Mobile phones introduced in 2010